Is That All You Wanted is Sherry Rich's third EP, released in 1997. The title track is lifted from her 1997 studio album Sherry Rich & Courtesy Move

Background

'Is That All You Wanted' is from the Sherry Rich and Courtesy Move studio album released in 1997. The song was recorded by Robb Earls at Quad and Vortex studios in Nashville, Tennessee in January 1997. The song was mixed by Jonathan Pines and Jay Bennett at Private studios, Urbana, Illinois in March, 1997.

Track listing
 Is That All You Wanted
 Jetstream Over Nashville 
 Young Love Drives
 Lonely and Far From Home

Release history
Tracks 2, 3 and 4 were recorded by Cal Orr in Melbourne in October, 1997. To promote the release of this song, Rich made an appearance on the Australian music TV show Recovery.

Personnel
 Sherry Rich - lead vocal, acoustic guitar
 Jay Bennett - lead guitar, background vocals
 John Stirratt - bass, background vocals
 Ken Coomer - drums

Guest Musicians
The songs 'Jetstream Over Nashville', 'Young Love Drives' and 'Lonely and Far From Home' featured:

 Nick Volk - bass guitar, pedal steel 
 Sherry Rich - acoustic guitar, vocals, harmonica
 Cal Orr - drums, additional guitar
 James Dixon - additional backing vocals

References

https://itunes.apple.com/au/album/is-that-all-you-wanted-ep/id310938180

1997 EPs
Sherry Rich albums